Felix J. Sanner (1867 in Cleveland, Ohio – 1946) was an American politician from New York.

Life

Sanner was a member of the New York State Assembly (Kings Co., 19th D.) in 1909 and 1910.

He was a member of the New York State Senate (9th D.) from 1911 to 1914, sitting in the 134th, 135th, 136th and 137th New York State Legislatures.

He was buried at the St. John Cemetery in Queens.

Sources
 Official New York from Cleveland to Hughes by Charles Elliott Fitch (Hurd Publishing Co., New York and Buffalo, 1911, Vol. IV; pg. 357f and 367)
 The New York Red Book (1913; pg. 105)

1867 births
1946 deaths
Democratic Party New York (state) state senators
People from Brooklyn
Democratic Party members of the New York State Assembly
Politicians from Cleveland